Rita Ramnani (born 21 December 1981) is a British actress and dancer known for her roles in The Hunt for Gollum, Jack Says and Umbrage. She holds a post-graduate degree in Classical Acting from London Academy of Music and Dramatic Art and a BA Drama, Theatre and Performance from University of Roehampton. She is of Indian descent.

Filmography

References

External links
 
 

1981 births
Place of birth missing (living people)
English film actresses
Living people
British actresses of Indian descent